Diarsia dislocata, the dislocated dart, is a moth of the family Noctuidae. It is found in Alaska and Ontario, Quebec, New Brunswick, Newfoundland and Labrador, British Columbia, Alberta, Saskatchewan, the Northwest Territories, Yukon and Manitoba in Canada. It is also found in the north-eastern parts of the United States, Washington and Colorado.

External links
Species report
Images
Moths of Rocky Mountain National Park

Diarsia
Moths of North America
Moths described in 1904